The Seram mountain pigeon (Gymnophaps stalkeri) is a species of bird in the pigeon family Columbidae that is endemic to the island of Seram in Indonesia, where it inhabits hill forest. It was long considered to be a subspecies of the Buru mountain pigeon, but was split on the basis of differences in appearance. It is a medium-sized pigeon with a buff-pink face and breast, wine-pink underparts, a grey nape, crown, back of neck, and thighs, and dark chestnut belly and underside of the tail.

The Seram mountain pigeon feeds on fruit and feeds in flocks of up to 50 birds. The only known nest was observed in September in old-growth montane forest and contained one egg. It is listed as being of least concern by the International Union for Conservation of Nature (IUCN) on the IUCN Red List due to its stable population and sufficiently large range.

Taxonomy and systematics 

The Seram mountain pigeon was described as Columba stalkeri by the Scottish ornithologist William Ogilvie-Grant in 1911 on the basis of specimens from the Kanobi Mountains on Seram, Indonesia. It was subsequently merged with the Buru mountain pigeon in the genus Gymnophaps by the Australian amateur ornithologist Gregory Mathews in 1927. It was again split as a distinct species on basis of differences in appearance in 2007 by Frank Rheindt and Robert Hutchinson.

The generic name Gymnophaps is derived from the Ancient Greek words γυμνος (gumnos), meaning bare, and φαψ (phaps), meaning pigeon. The specific name stalkeri is in honour of Wilfred Stalker, an Australian natural history collector who collected the type specimens of the species on a British Ornithologists' Union expedition. Seram mountain pigeon is the official common name designated by the International Ornithologists' Union. Other common names for the species include Seram long-tailed mountain-pigeon.

The Seram mountain pigeon is one of four species in the mountain pigeon genus Gymnophaps, which is found in Melanesia and the Maluku Islands. It forms a superspecies with the other species in its genus. Within its family, the genus Gymnophaps is sister to Lopholaimus, and these two together form a clade sister to Hemiphaga. The species has no subspecies.

Description 
It has a deep buff-pink face and breast, paler on the chin, changing to wine-pink on the underparts. The thighs are grey and the nape, crown, and back of neck are pale, pure blue-grey, while the belly and underside of the tail are dark chestnut with wine-grey fringes to the feathers. The eyes are scarlet to yellow with purplish red to scarlet orbital skin, the bill is yellow with a purple cere, and the legs are purple. Juveniles have browner upperparts, have browner underparts, and are darker below the tail. They also have dull red orbital skin, dull red legs, and a white-tipped grey bill with a dull red cere.

Distribution and habitat 
The Seram mountain pigeon is endemic to Seram in the Maluku Islands.

Behaviour and ecology 
The species is very social, frequently being seen in flocks of over 20 birds. It feeds on fruit. Foraging flocks can have over 20 birds, with some being as large as 50 individuals.

Breeding 
The Seram mountain pigeon has been observed making a display flight in February. The display is similar to that of Papuan mountain pigeons, males of which launch themselves upwards from a perch before plummeting down and returning. However, the display of the Seram mountain pigeon is lower and less steep, and it continues flying forward after descending instead of returning to the perch immediately.

It was lined loosely with twigs and moss, and contained a single white egg.

Status 
The Seram mountain pigeon is listed as being of least concern by the International Union for Conservation of Nature (IUCN) on the IUCN Red List due to its stable population and sufficiently large range.

References 

Seram mountain pigeon
Birds of Seram
Endemic fauna of Seram Island
Taxa named by William Robert Ogilvie-Grant
Seram mountain pigeon